Love on the Run is a 1985 television film starring Alec Baldwin and Stephanie Zimbalist.  A criminal lawyer goes on the run with her escaped convict lover.

Plot
Diana Rockland, an inhibited and reclusive attorney whom is berated for the lack of momentum and enthusiasm in her life by her father and sister, has been assigned to represent a convict, Sean Carpenter, who has killed a fellow inmate during a prison brawl, supposedly in self-defence. As she counsels Sean, an attraction that leads to a secret romance ensues, which leads to Diana eventually helping Sean escape the prison.

Cast
 Stephanie Zimbalist as Diana Rockland
 Alec Baldwin as Sean Carpenter
 Constance McCashin as Elizabeth Nellison
 Howard Duff as Lionel Rockland
 Madison Mason as Roy Nellison
 Ernie Hudson as Lamar
 Francine Lembi as Bonnie
 Kit Le Fever as Cherry
 Matthew Cowles as Yancy
 Arnold F. Turner as Rick Wade
 David Hayward as Gary Synder
 Ken Lerner as Aaron
 Savannah Smith Boucher as Martha
 Burke Byrnes as Melvin Small
 Beau Starr as Lt. Sturges

References

External links

1985 television films
1985 films
American television films
Films scored by Billy Goldenberg
Films about lawyers
Films directed by Gus Trikonis
1980s English-language films